Hrušov may refer to several places.

 Hrušov, Rožňava District in Slovakia
 Hrušov, Veľký Krtíš District in Slovakia
 Hrušov (Mladá Boleslav District), village in Mladá Boleslav District, in the Czech Republic
 Hrušov (Ostrava), part of the city of Ostrava, in the Czech Republic
 , a ruined castle near Hostie, Zlaté Moravce District, Nitra Region, western-central Slovakia